The Canadian International Organ Competition (CIOC) is an organisation devoted to the promotion of organ music. It works in collaboration with various organisations of the organ world to fulfill its mission. In Montreal every three years, the CIOC presents an international competition open to organists of all nationalities under 35 years of age. Sixteen organ virtuosi perform for a jury of nine internationally renowned specialists and compete for major awards. In addition to the prize money ($30,000 for the winner, $70,000 total) the top prizewinner receives a three-year representation agreement for USA and Canada, a CD recording, recitals and career coaching.

The CIOC first edition took place from October 8–19, 2008, the second edition from October 5–16, 2011 in Montreal, the third from October 7–19, 2014 and the fourth edition from October 6–21, 2017.

History
Since 1997, the McGill Summer Organ Academy has welcomed some of the world's foremost organists to teach and perform. The closure of the Calgary International Organ Competition in 2002 offered an opportunity for Montreal fill the void with its own competition. By 2006, a group of music lovers had gathered around John Grew, McGill University Organist, to create the CIOC.

Juries
Prior to the beginning of each competition, the CIOC Board of Directors approves the jury selected by CIOC's Artistic Director John Grew. These jurors hold sole responsibility for choosing which competitors will receive the CIOC awards. Jurors are chosen from a wide range of international artists, based on their work and excellent reputations. The competition jury of nine is presided over by John Grew.

2008 edition
From 58 applicants from 17 countries, 16 competitors representing 11 countries were selected by a Preliminary Jury. Over 7,000 people attended the CIOC 40-event programme. There was no charge for entry to the rounds of competition.

The inaugural Canadian International Organ Competition was won by Frédéric Champion from France. Frédéric Champion acted as the organisation's ambassador during concert tours he has given in North America, Europe and Asia till the next winner was declared in 2011.

2008 Laureates
 First: Frédéric Champion, France
 Second: Andrew Dewar, United Kingdom
 Third: Jens Korndörfer – Germany

2008 Special prizes
 Richard Bradshaw Audience Prize: Frédéric Champion, France
 Bach Prize: Els Biesemans, Belgium
 Messiaen Prize: Andrew Dewar, United Kingdom
 Royal Canadian College of Organists Prize: Jonathan Oldengarm, Canada

2011 edition
Out of 60 applicants from 17 countries, 16 contestants were invited to compete in Montreal.

2011 Laureates
 First: Christian Lane, USA
 Second: Jens Korndörfer, Germany
 Third: ex-aequo, Jean-Willy, France, Balthasar Baumgartner, Germany

2011 Special prizes
 Richard Bradshaw Audience Prize: Jean-Willy Kunz, France
 Bach Prize: Yulia Yufereva, Russia
 Jehan Alain Prize: Andreas Jud, Switzerland
 Liszt Prize : Jens Korndörfer, Germany
 Royal Canadian College of Organists Prize: Jared Ostermann, USA

2014 edition
From 42 applicants, including 25 men and 17 women, 16 were invited to Montreal. The 2014 Competition took place in Montreal from October 7–19, 2014 in churches such as Saint-Jean-Baptiste and Notre-Dame Basilica; the CIOC winners played on the Grand Orgue Pierre-Béique organ of the Orchestre symphonique de Montréal in the Maison Symphonique. In total almost 10 000 came to CIOC events, including 40 concerts, competition rounds and events.

2014 Laureates
 First: David Baskeyfield, United-Kingdom
 Second: Andrew Dewar, United-Kingdom
 Third: Daria Burlak, Russia

2014 Special prizes
 Richard Bradshaw Audience Prize: David Baskeyfield, United-Kingdom
 Bach Prize: Andrew Dewar, United-Kingdom
 Royal Canadian College of Organists Prize: David Baskeyfield, United-Kingdom

2017 edition
20 young talents were invited to play in Montreal at the 2017 edition. The 2017 Competition took place in Montreal from October 6–21, 2017 in at Church of the Immaculate Conception, Church of St-Jean-Baptiste and Notre-Dame Basilica.

2017 Laureates
 First: Alcée Chris, United States
 Second: Oliver Brett, United Kingdom
 Third: Nicholas Capozzoli, United States

2017 Special prizes
 Bach Prize: Alcée Chris, United States

References

External links
 Canadian International Organ Competition
 

Music organizations based in Canada
2008 establishments in Quebec
Music competitions in Canada